Alemitu Bekele Aga (born 22 August 1976) is an Ethiopian-born Belgium long-distance runner who specialized in cross-country running, half-marathon and marathon.

Alemitu Bekele is a former Belgian marathon, half marathon and 10,000 metres champion. Furthermore, she became Benelux marathon champion 2008 at the Eindhoven Marathon.

International competitions

External links
 

1976 births
Living people
Ethiopian female long-distance runners
Belgian female long-distance runners